Spodoptera cilium, known variously as dark mottled willow, lawn caterpillar and grasslawn armyworm, is a noctuid moth found throughout much of sub-Saharan Africa and western, southern, and south-east Asia and several countries in southern and eastern Europe. It is a migrant to northern Europe and has been recorded at least nine times in the United Kingdom.

The larva feeds on Oryza.  It is sometimes a pest.

See also 
 African armyworm (Spodoptera exempta)

References

External links

Fauna Europaea
Funet.fi
Lepiforum.de
UK Moths

Spodoptera
Agricultural pest insects
Insect pests of ornamental plants
Moths described in 1852
Owlet moths of Europe
Owlet moths of Africa
Moths of Japan
Moths of Madagascar
Moths of Mauritius
Moths of the Middle East
Moths of Réunion
Moths of Seychelles
Taxa named by Achille Guenée